Palauan Americans are Americans of Palauan descent. According to the 2010 census, there are about 7,450 Americans of Palauan origin.

History 
Since the late 1940s, many Palauans have emigrated abroad. In 1953, about a hundred people from Palau founded the Palau Association in the American island of Guam. Over the years, the number of Palauans has continually grown.

In early 1970, when the Pell Grant was extended, several hundred Palauans and other students of Micronesia emigrated to study at American universities. Since then, the number of Palauan students emigrating to USA has increased by about 250 people every year.

Many Palauans live in California, most notably, Pasadena. Palauans also live in Portland, Oregon, where a few thousand Micronesians live, and Corsicana, Texas.

Notable people

Elgin Loren Elwais
Florian Skilang Temengil

References 

 
Micronesian American
Oceanian American
Pacific Islands American
Palauan diaspora